Artigues is a commune in the Ariège department, region of Occitania, southwestern France.

The inhabitants of the commune are known as Artiguois or Artiguoises.

Geography
Artigues is a remote mountain commune some 25 km south by south-west of Quillan and 20 km east of Ax-les-Thermes in a direct line. The D16 road from Rouze to Le Pla passes through the north-eastern corner of the commune but has no access to the commune. Access to the village is by a small mountain road, Laoutre, from Mijanès in the north-west. The commune is extremely rugged and heavily forested with alpine vegetation below the snow line. There is some farming activity near the village.

The Ruisseau de Boutadieu forms the south-eastern border of the commune and flows north to join the Ruisseau d'Artigues which forms the rest of the eastern border as it flows north to join the Quérigut River just north of the commune. The Ruisseau de Laurenti rises in the south of the commune and flows north into the Étang de Laurenti in the south-centre of the commune. From there it continues east to join the Ruisseau de Boutadieu. The Ruisseau de Fournet rises in the centre of the commune and flows north to join the Bruyante west of the commune. The Barrage de Noubais is on the northern border of the commune and the stream flowing out of it forms the northern border as it flows north-east to join the Quérigut.

Neighbouring communes and villages

Administration

List of Successive Mayors

Demography
In 2017 the commune had 56 inhabitants.

Sites and monuments

In the Parish Church are several objects which are registered as historical objects:
2 Statues: Saint Just and Saint Pasteur (18th century)
A Chalice (17th century)
6 Candlesticks (17th century)
A Chandelier (18th century)

See also
Communes of the Ariège department

References

External links
Artigues on the National Geographic Institute website 
Artigues on Géoportail, National Geographic Institute (IGN) website 
Arugues on the 1750 Cassini Map

Communes of Ariège (department)